"Some Girls Do" is a song written by Mark Miller, and recorded by American country music band Sawyer Brown.  It was released in March 1992 as the second (third if "The Walk" is counted) single from their album The Dirt Road.  It was a number-one hit in the United States, while it peaked at number 2 in Canada.

American Aquarium covered the song on their 2021 album Slappers, Bangers, and Certified Twangers: Vol 1.

Content
The narrator states that some girls don't like boys like him, but "some girls do.".  The song begins with a potential object of his affection turning up her nose at his Cadillac as a way of rebuffing his attentions.  Another woman witnesses the exchange from her front porch as she's painting her nails.  She hints that it takes more than that to attract a woman, and they hook up with one another.

Music video
The music video was directed by Michael Salomon.

Chart positions

Year-end charts

References

1992 singles
Sawyer Brown songs
Songs written by Mark Miller (musician)
Music videos directed by Michael Salomon
Curb Records singles
1992 songs